Jurnal al-Khidiw (- lit. "Journal of the Khedive"), first published 1821–1822, was the first printed periodical in Arabic. It was a bilingual Turkish–Arabic bulletin for official use, with a run as small as 100 copies. At first it was handwritten and printed lithographically with irregular frequency. It was later printed with weekly and then daily frequency.

It was succeeded by Al-Waqa'i' al-Misriyya, first published December 3, 1828.

References 

Newspapers published in Egypt
Ottoman Turkish language
Arabic-language mass media
Muhammad Ali of Egypt